Pudur is a small village in Ilayangudi Taluk, Sivagangai District of Tamil Nadu, India. It is located on State Highway 28 (SH-28) connecting Karaikudi and Ilayangudi.

Religion 
Pudur is home to two mosques for men and a mosque for women, as the town is primarily populated by Muslims.

Schools 
There are two government primary schools, two private primary schools, and a higher secondary school (Haji K. K. Ibrahim Ali Higher Secondary School) with a total population of around 1000 students from more than 25 villages around Pudur.

Villages in Sivaganga district